Menindee railway station is located on the Broken Hill line in New South Wales, Australia. It serves the town of Menindee.

History
Menindee station opened on 15 July 1919 when the line opened from Broken Hill. It served as the terminus until the line was extended east in November 1927 to connect with the line from Sydney. Until this point, the line was isolated from the rest of the New South Wales Government Railways network.

Services
Menindee is served by NSW TrainLink's weekly Outback Xplorer between Sydney and Broken Hill.

Journey Beyond's weekly Indian Pacific service passes Menindee but does not stop at the station.

References

External links
Menindee station details Transport for New South Wales

Railway stations in Australia opened in 1919
Regional railway stations in New South Wales